Voltamp was an early American manufacturer of toy trains based in Baltimore, Maryland. Founded by Manes Fuld (1863–1929), the son of a Baltimore stove dealer, Voltamp's trains utilized the same 2-inch gauge metal track as Carlisle & Finch, the inventor of the electric toy train. It is significant for its 1907 release of the first electric toy train that operated on household alternating current; earlier electric trains had used battery power.

Voltamp released its first toy train product in 1903.

Although Voltamp outlasted Carlisle & Finch, its primary competitor, both companies were eclipsed in the marketplace by the Ives Manufacturing Company and Lionel Corporation, and Voltamp exited the market in 1922, selling its line to Boucher.

References

Voltamp Trains: The Train Collectors Association
Voltamp  at Historytoy.com
Natural Wooden Toys

Toy train manufacturers
Manufacturing companies disestablished in 1922
Manufacturing companies established in 1903
1903 establishments in Maryland
1922 disestablishments in Maryland
Defunct manufacturing companies based in Maryland
Toy companies of the United States